Kabakon or Kaka Kon Island is a small island in  group of Duke of York Islands in the Bismark Archipelago, Papua New Guinea. August Engelhardt chose Kabakon as the island to establish his Sun-worshipping sect, notable for only eating coconuts, from 1902 until his death.

References

Islands of Papua New Guinea
East New Britain Province